Virginia State Route 5 (SR 5) is a primary state highway in the Commonwealth of Virginia. It runs between the independent cities of Richmond and Williamsburg. Between Charles City County and James City County, it crosses the Chickahominy River via the Judith Stewart Dresser Bridge, a fixed-span bridge which replaced historic Barrett's Ferry and the former drawbridge.

The entire length of SR 5 outside Richmond and Williamsburg is a Virginia Byway. Since 2015, the Virginia Capital Trail dedicated pedestrian and bicycle trail runs alongside the automobile highway.

Route description

For much of its distance, SR 5 generally parallels the north bank of the James River, following the path of older colonial roads. It passes through three of the original eight shires created in the Colony of Virginia in 1634 by King Charles I of England. These are James City County, Charles City County, and Henrico County, moving from east to west as the area was developed in the colonial period.

James River plantations 

Some of the larger and older of the extant James River Plantations are along the route. None is owned by any government. Houses and/or grounds are generally open daily to visitors, with various admission fees applicable. From west to east, these are the Shirley Plantation, Edgewood Plantation, Berkeley Plantation, Westover Plantation, Evelynton Plantation, Belle Air Plantation, Piney Grove at Southall's Plantation, North Bend Plantation and Sherwood Forest Plantation.

History
The first piece of SR 5 was added to the state highway system in 1923, a portion of the road running west from Charles City for  toward Richmond, and was numbered State Route 41.  were added in 1924,  were added in 1925, and the remaining , taking the route to the Richmond city limits, were added in 1927.

An extension to the east, heading north from Charles City to State Route 39 (now U.S. Route 60) at Providence Forge, was added in 1926.

The road from State Route 32 (now U.S. Route 15) at Zion Crossroads east to Oilville was added to the state highway system by 1923 as State Route 321. By 1927, SR 321 became an extension of SR 41 west from Richmond, and that year the former SR 321 was extended , the rest of the way to Richmond.

In Richmond, SR 41 initially used Broad Street, a hairpin turn through Chimborazo Park, Fulton Street, Williamsburg Road, Hatcher Street, Newton Road, and New Osborne Turnpike.

State Route 39 from Shadwell west to Monterey, now U.S. Route 250, was part of the initial 1918 state highway system (numbered State Route 9 until 1923). It initially continued west from Monterey on present US 250, but by 1924 it used current State Route 84 west to West Virginia.

In the 1933 renumbering, State Routes 41 and 835 both became part of a new State Route 5, as did the piece of State Route 39 from Monterey to Shadwell. By 1935, the whole route west of Richmond became an extension of U.S. Route 250 into Virginia, truncating SR 5 to its present Richmond-Williamsburg route.

SR 5 was extended east along State Route 31 through Williamsburg to State Route 168 (now State Route 143) "to improve the service to travelers interchanging between Route 5 and Routes 60 and 168" in 1958. SR 31 has since been truncated to the SR 5 junction.

Major intersections

Road names

References

External links

Virginia Highways Project: VA 5

005
State Route 005
State Route 005
State Route 005
State Route 005
State Route 005
005
U.S. Route 250